Discovery Rupes is an escarpment on Mercury, approximately  long, located at latitude 58.52 N and longitude 53.25 W. It was formed by a thrust fault, thought to have occurred due to the shrinkage of the planet's core as it cooled over time. The scarp cuts through Duccio crater.

The rupes are named after the Carnegie, a wooden (non-magnetic) American ship used to carry out magnetic observations.

References

Scarps on Mercury